Bogur is a village in Dharwad district in the southern state of Karnataka, India.

Demographics
As of the 2011 Census of India there were 225 households in Bogur and a total population of 1,099 consisting of 573 males and 526 females. There were 160 children ages 0-6.

References

Villages in Belagavi district